Ann Louise Wagner (née Trousdale, September 13, 1962) is an American politician and former diplomat serving as the U.S. representative for Missouri's 2nd congressional district. A member of the Republican Party, she was the United States ambassador to Luxembourg from 2005 to 2009.

Her district, based in St. Louis County, is heavily suburban and the state's wealthiest. It includes most of St. Louis's southern and western suburbs as well as some of the northern exurbs in St. Charles County and the northern part of Jefferson County. Before her diplomatic post, Wagner chaired the Missouri Republican Party from 1999 until 2005; she co-chaired the Republican National Committee for four years, starting in 2001.

Early life and education 
Wagner was born and raised in St. Louis. Her parents owned two carpet stores where she worked growing up. She attended Cor Jesu Academy, a private Catholic all-girls school in South County, and graduated from the University of Missouri in 1984 with a BSBA from the business school with an emphasis in logistics. After college, she worked in the private sector and held management positions at Hallmark Cards in Kansas City and Ralston Purina in St. Louis.

Career

1990s
Wagner entered Republican politics in 1990, heading the GOP's efforts during the decennial redistricting of Missouri. In 1992, she was state director of President George H. W. Bush's unsuccessful reelection campaign.

2000s

Missouri GOP
Wagner was elected to her first term of office as chair of the Missouri Republican Party in 1999, becoming the first woman to occupy the position. Her most notable achievement in that role came during her second two-year term, when she oversaw the party's taking majority control of both chambers of the Missouri General Assembly, winning the Senate in a 2001 special election and the House in the 2002 general election, the first time this had been seen in over 40 years. During her third term, the party held its majorities in both chambers and also took the governor's seat for the first time in 12 years with Matt Blunt's election in 2004, giving the GOP complete control of state government for the first time since 1921. Her six years as chairperson witnessed George W. Bush carry Missouri in both of his presidential bids and also saw the Republican Party win a majority of the state's congressional delegation.

National campaigning
In 2001, Wagner took office as a co-chair of the Republican National Committee and helped preside over the 2004 Republican National Convention. In this position, she took a strong role in directing the development of the Winning Women initiative, whose aim was to improve the GOP's image with women and demonstrate the relevance of its platform to them. Her work with the committee took her to 48 states. In January 2005, she left her role as co-chair after one term.

In 2004, Wagner was a fundraising "ranger" for President George W. Bush.

U.S. ambassadorship
On February 20, 2005, Wagner was elected to a fourth term as chair of the Missouri Republican Party. On May 16, Bush nominated her as United States ambassador to Luxembourg. On July 16, 2005, she was confirmed in the post by a voice vote in the United States Senate, after which Senator Jim Talent said she was "a considerate woman, whose character and abilities uniquely qualify her to represent our nation."

On August 1, she was sworn in as Ambassador by U.S. Secretary of State Condoleezza Rice in the Benjamin Franklin Room of the Harry S Truman Building.

2010s

2010 U.S. Senate election

After returning from Luxembourg, Wagner served as chair of Roy Blunt's 2010 U.S. Senate campaign. Blunt defeated Missouri Secretary of State Robin Carnahan, 54%–41%.

2011 RNC chair election

On November 29, 2010, Wagner sent a video message to the committee members of the Republican National Committee announcing she was running for RNC chair. The election was held in January 2011, and Wagner conceded after the sixth round after receiving 17 votes. Wisconsin Republican Party chair Reince Priebus won.

U.S. House of Representatives

Elections

2012

Wagner announced her candidacy for Missouri's 2nd congressional district after incumbent Representative Todd Akin announced his candidacy for U.S. Senate. Wagner was endorsed by New Jersey Governor Chris Christie, former Arkansas Governor Mike Huckabee, former U.S. Attorney General John Ashcroft, and the anti-abortion women's group the Susan B. Anthony List. She won the four-way Republican primary—the de facto election given the lack of support for Democratic nominee Glenn Koenen—with 66% of the vote. In November, she won the general election by 23 points.

Wagner is the third Republican woman elected to Congress from Missouri (after Jo Ann Emerson and Vicky Hartzler), and the second who was not elected as a stand-in for her husband (after Hartzler; Emerson was originally elected to finish out the term of her late husband, Bill Emerson).

2014

In her first bid for reelection, Wagner ran unopposed in the Republican primary and easily won the general election, increasing her margin of victory from 2012.

2016

2018

Wagner had a closer-than-expected race against Democratic attorney Cort VanOstran, but prevailed with 51.2% of the vote to VanOstran's 47.2%. It was only the third time since 1986 that a Democrat had managed even 40% of the vote in this district.

2020
Wagner was considered potentially vulnerable due to the surprisingly close margin in 2018 and President Donald Trump's unpopularity in suburban areas. State senator Jill Schupp, whose state senate district covers much of the St. Louis County portion of the congressional district, won the Democratic nomination unopposed.

By the fall of 2020, The Cook Political Report listed the race as a toss-up. Wagner defeated Schupp by just over six percentage points. At the same time, Trump carried the 2nd by only 115 votes, a marked turnabout from his 11-point win in 2016. It was the closest that a Democratic presidential nominee had come to carrying the district since it lost its share of St. Louis after the 1980 census.

2022
Wagner was reelected in 2022, defeating Trish Gunby.

Tenure

In 2016, Wagner made headlines by withdrawing her endorsement for the GOP nominee for president, Donald Trump. Wagner's position on Trump changed several times since her initial endorsement in September; in October she withdrew her support and called on Trump to step down, but in November walked that statement back and voiced her intention to vote for Trump.

On May 4, 2017, Wagner voted for the American Health Care Act, which would have repealed Obamacare.

In December 2020, Wagner was one of 126 Republican members of the House of Representatives to sign an amicus brief in support of Texas v. Pennsylvania, a lawsuit filed at the United States Supreme Court attacking election procedures in four states, all won by Joe Biden, in the 2020 United States presidential election. Wagner did not join other congressional Republicans in objecting to the certification of the 2021 United States Electoral College vote count.

On July 19, 2022, Wagner and 46 other Republican Representatives voted for the Respect for Marriage Act, which would codify the right to same-sex marriage in federal law.

Legislation sponsored
The following is an incomplete list of legislation Wagner has sponsored:
 Retail Investor Protection Act (H.R. 2374; 113th Congress) – a bill that would delay the Department of Labor's regulations on when a financial advisor must be considered a fiduciary.
 Stop Advertising Victims of Exploitation Act of 2014 (H.R. 4225; 113th Congress) – a bill that would prohibit knowingly benefiting financially from, receiving anything of value from, or distributing advertising that offers a commercial sex act in a manner that violates federal criminal code prohibitions against sex trafficking of children or of any person by force, fraud, or coercion. The bill would make it a felony to post prostitution ads online. Wagner said that Congress was "taking steps towards ending what I would call modern-day slavery." She argued that her bill had been reviewed by the Justice Department in an attempt to ensure that it did not violate the First Amendment to the United States Constitution's guarantee of the right to free speech, that the House had not passed any legislation on human trafficking in 13 years, and that "our efforts to combat sex trafficking need to be updated to match the problem as it stands today."
 Retail Investor Protection Act (HR 1090; 114th Congress)—a revised version of legislation Wagner sponsored that would delay the DOL's regulations regarding fiduciary advisors that passed the House on October 27, 2015, by a vote of 245–186.

Committee assignments
 Committee on Financial Services (Vice Ranking Member)
 Subcommittee on Capital Markets and Government-Sponsored Enterprises
 Subcommittee on Oversight and Investigations
 Committee on Foreign Affairs (Vice Ranking Member)

Caucus memberships
 Republican Study Committee
 Congressional Constitution Caucus

Personal life 
Ann is married to Ray Wagner Jr., a former director of the Missouri Department of Revenue and the Illinois Department of Revenue. They live in Ballwin, a western suburb of St. Louis. They have three children.

Ann's mother-in-law was Loretto Wagner, a noted anti-abortion activist.

Wagner is Roman Catholic.

See also
 Women in the United States House of Representatives

References

External links 

 Congresswoman Ann Wagner official U.S. House website
 Ann Wagner for Congress
 
 
 

|-

|-

|-

1962 births
21st-century American politicians
21st-century American women politicians
Ambassadors of the United States to Luxembourg
American Roman Catholics
American women ambassadors
Catholics from Missouri
Female members of the United States House of Representatives
Living people
Politicians from St. Louis
Republican Party members of the United States House of Representatives from Missouri
State political party chairs of Missouri
University of Missouri alumni
Women in Missouri politics
21st-century American diplomats